The following is a list of notable synthesizers.

References 

!
Keyboard instruments
Electric and electronic keyboard instruments
Lists of musical instruments